Khosrow I (also spelled Khosrau, Khusro or Chosroes; ; New Persian:  []), traditionally known by his epithet of Anushirvan ( [] "the Immortal Soul"), was the Sasanian King of Kings of Iran from 531 to 579. He was the son and successor of Kavad I.

Inheriting a reinvigorated empire at war with the Byzantines, Khosrow I made a peace treaty with them in 532, known as the Perpetual Peace, in which the Byzantine emperor Justinian I paid 11,000 pounds of gold to the Sasanians. Khosrow then focused on consolidating his power, executing conspirators, including his uncle Bawi. Dissatisfied with the actions of the Byzantine clients and vassals, the Ghassanids, and encouraged by the Ostrogoth envoys from Italy, Khosrow violated the peace treaty and declared war against the Byzantines in 540. He sacked the major city of Antioch and deported its population to Persia. In 541, he invaded Lazica and made it an Iranian protectorate, thus initiating the Lazic War. In 545, the two empires agreed to halt the wars in Mesopotamia and Syria, while it waged on in Lazica. A truce was made in 557, and by 562 a Fifty-Year Peace Treaty was made.

In 572, Justin II, the successor of Justinian, broke the peace treaty and sent a Byzantine force into the Sasanian region of Arzanene. The following year, Khosrow besieged and captured the important Byzantine fortress-city of Dara, which drove Justin II insane. The war would last till 591, outliving Khosrow. Khosrow's wars were not only based in the west. To the east, in an alliance with the Göktürks, he finally put an end to the Hephthalite Empire, which had inflicted a handful of defeats on the Sasanians in the 5th-century, killing Khosrow's grandfather Peroz I. To the south, Iranian forces led by Wahrez defeated the Aksumites and conquered Yemen.

Khosrow I was known for his character, virtues and knowledge. During his ambitious reign, he continued his father's project of making major social, military, and economic reforms, promoting the welfare of the people, increasing state revenues, establishing a professional army, and founding or rebuilding many cities, palaces, and much infrastructure. He was interested in literature and philosophy, and under his reign, art and science flourished in Iran. He was the most distinguished of the Sasanian kings, and his name became, like that of Caesar in the history of Rome, a designation of the Sasanian kings. Due to his accomplishments, he was hailed as the new Cyrus.

At the time of his death, the Sasanian Empire had reached its greatest extent since Shapur II, stretching from Yemen in the west to Gandhara in the east. He was succeeded by his son Hormizd IV.

Name and titles 
"Khosrow" is the New Persian variant of his name used by scholars; his original name was Middle Persian, Husraw, itself derived from Avestan Haosrauuah ("he who has good fame"). The name is transliterated in Greek as Chosroes (Χοσρόης) and in Arabic as Kisra. Besides his personal name, he is widely known in sources by his epithet of Anushirvan ("the Immortal Soul"), a New Persian rendering of Middle Persian anūšag-ruwān. Other variants of the name are Anoshirvan, Anushiravan and Nowshīrvān. Another epithet Khosrow was known by was Dadgar ("Dispenser of Justice").

Historiography 
Many sources dating to the Islamic era, such as al-Tabari's Arabic History of Prophets and Kings and the Shahnameh ("Book of Kings") of the medieval Persian epic of Ferdowsi (d. 1020), give much information regarding Khosrow's reforms, and thus most likely drew both of their information from the Middle Persian history book Khwaday-Namag ("Book of Lords"). Other works were made independently, such as the Sirat Anushirwan, which was reportedly an autobiography made by Khosrow himself, and survives in the work of Miskawayh (932–1030). Khosrow is also mentioned in several Greek sources, such as the ones of Procopius, Agathias and Menander Protector, who all give important information regarding Khosrow's management of the Irano-Roman wars. Syriac authors, such as John of Ephesus and Zacharias Rhetor also include Khosrow in their work, offering a perception of the consequences that his expeditions brought on the people who lived on the Roman border.

Background 

Khosrow I was reportedly born between 512 and 514 at Ardestan, a town located in the Spahan province in central Iran. The town, dating back to the Achaemenid period, thrived during Khosrow's age, and also included a fire temple, which was said to be founded by the mythological Kayanian king Kay Bahman, from whom the Sasanians claimed their descent. Khosrow was the youngest son of Kavad I, the ruling Sasanian shah. His mother was an Ispahbudhan princess, who was the sister of the leading Iranian general Bawi. The Ispahbudhan were one of the Seven Great Houses of Iran that formed the elite aristocracy of the Sasanian Empire. They in particular enjoyed such a high status that they were acknowledged as "kin and partners of the Sasanians". The family also held the important position of spahbed of the West, i.e. the Sasanian Empire's southwestern regions (Khwarwaran).

Following the tradition of the aristocratic or upper-class families, Khosrow would have started at school (frahangestān) between the age of five and seven. There he would learn to write and would learn the yashts, Hadokht, Bayān Yasn and Vendidad, following the same pattern of schooling made for a future priest (herbed). Furthermore, he would observe the Middle Persian translation of the Avesta, the Zend. Afterwards, he would be schooled in riding, archery, polo (chovgan) and military creativity.

Early life

Negotiations with the Byzantines over the adoption of Khosrow

In , Kavad, in order to secure the succession of Khosrow, whose position was threatened by rival brothers and the Mazdakite sect, proposed that Emperor Justin I adopt him. The proposal was initially greeted with enthusiasm by the Byzantine Emperor and his nephew, Justinian, but Justin's quaestor, Proclus, opposed the move, due to the concern of Khosrow possibly later try to take over the Byzantine throne. The Byzantines instead made a counter-proposal to adopt Khosrow not as a Roman, but a barbarian. In the end the negotiations did not come to a consensus. Khosrow reportedly felt insulted by the Byzantines, and his attitude deteriorated towards them.

Mahbod, who had along with Siyawush acted as the diplomats of the negotiations, accused the latter of purposely sabotaging the negotiations. Further accusations were made towards Siyawush, which included the reverence of new deities and having his dead wife buried, which was a violation of Iranian laws. Siyawush was thus most likely a Mazdakite, the religious sect that Kavad originally supported but now had withdrawn his support from. Although Siyawush was a close friend of Kavad and had helped him escape from imprisonment, the latter did not try to prevent his execution, seemingly with the purpose of restricting Siyawush's immense authority as the head of the Sasanian army, a post which was disliked by the other nobles. Siyawush was executed, and his office was abolished. Despite the breakdown of the negotiations, it was not until 530 that full-scale warfare on the main eastern frontier broke out. In the intervening years, the two sides preferred to wage war by proxy, through Arab allies in the south and Huns in the north.

Persecution of Mazdak and his followers

Mazdak was the name of a chief representative of a religious and philosophical teaching called Mazdakism, which opposed violence, and called for the sharing of wealth, women and property, an archaic form of communism. Mazdakism not only consisted of theological and cosmological aspects, but also political and social impacts, which was to the disadvantage of the nobility and clergy. According to modern historians Touraj Daryaee and Matthew Canepa, sharing women was most likely an overstatement and defamation deriving from Mazdak's decree that loosened marriage rules to help the lower classes. Powerful families saw this as a tactic to weaken their lineage and advantages, which was most likely the case. Kavad used the movement as a political tool to curb the power of the nobility and clergy. With the nobility and clergy weakened, Kavad was able to make reforms with less difficulty. With the reforms roaring by the 520s, he no longer had use of Mazdak. As a result, he officially withdrew his support from the Mazdakites. A debate was arranged, where not only the Zoroastrian priesthood, but also the Christian and Jewish ones slandered Mazdak and his followers.

According to the Shahnameh ("The Book of Kings"), written several centuries later by the medieval Persian poet Ferdowsi, Kavad had Mazdak and his supporters sent to Khosrow, who had his supporters killed by burying their heads in a walled orchard, with only their feet being visible. Khosrow then summoned Mazdak to look at his garden, saying the following; "You will find trees there that no-one has ever seen and no-one ever heard of even from the mouth of the ancient sages." Mazdak, seeing his followers corpses, screamed and passed out. He was afterwards executed by Khosrow, who had his feet fastened on a gallows, and had his men shoot arrows at him. The validity of the story is uncertain; Ferdowsi used much earlier reports of events to write the Shahnameh, and thus the story may report some form of contemporary memory.

Accession

The Eternal Peace of 532 

In 531, while the Iranian army was besieging Martyropolis, Kavad became ill and died. Khosrow succeeded him, but due to his domestic position being insecure, he wanted to make peace with the Byzantines, who themselves under Emperor Justinian I (r. 527–565) were perhaps already more focused on recovering the lost western half of the Roman Empire than in pursuing war against Iran. The Byzantine envoys Rufinus, Hermogenes, Alexander and Thomas found Khosrow in a more conciliatory disposition than his father, and an agreement was soon reached. Justinian would pay 110 centenaria (11,000 pounds) of gold, ostensibly as a contribution to the defence of the Caucasus passes against the barbarians living beyond, and the base of the dux Mesopotamiae would be withdrawn from the fortress of Dara to the city of Constantina. The two rulers would recognize once again each other as equal and pledged mutual assistance. Khosrow initially refused to hand back the two Lazic forts, while demanding the return of the two other forts the Byzantines had captured in Sasanian Armenia. Justinian at first agreed, but soon changed his mind, causing the agreement to be broken off. In summer 532, however, a new embassy by Hermogenes and Rufinus managed to persuade Khosrow for a full exchange of the occupied forts, as well as for allowing the exiled Iberian rebels to either remain in the Byzantine Empire or return safely to their homes.

Consolidation of power 
Sometime during the early reign of Khosrow, he had to deal with his eldest brother Kawus, who ruled as governor-king of the northern province of Padishkhwargar. Unlike Khosrow, he was a Mazdakite (or at least had strong Mazdakite sympathies), and thus had their support as the candidate for the throne. Kawus asserted to be the legitimate heir of the throne due to his older age. He was, however, defeated by Khosrow's forces and taken to Ctesiphon, where Khosrow summoned the priests and urged Kawus to make confessions and ask for forgiveness, so that he could be released. Kawus refused, preferring death, forcing Khosrow to have him killed. Khosrow reportedly "cursed the fortunes" for "forcing him to kill a brother like Kawus."

Another danger to Khosrow's rule was that of his uncle Bawi, who along with other members of the Iranian aristocracy, became involved in a conspiracy in which they tried to overthrow Khosrow and make Kavad, the son of Khosrow's brother Jamasp, the shah of Iran. Upon learning of the plot, Khosrow executed all his brothers and their offspring, along with Bawi and the other aristocrats who were involved. Khosrow also ordered the execution of Kavad, who was still a child, and was away from the court, being raised by Adergoudounbades. Khosrow sent orders to kill Kavad, but Adergoudounbades disobeyed and brought him up in secret, until he was betrayed to the shah in 541 by his own son, Bahram. Khosrow had him executed, but Kavad, or someone claiming to be him, managed to flee to the Byzantine Empire.

Reforms

Summary
Khosrow I represents the epitome of the philosopher king in the Sasanian Empire. Upon his ascent to the throne, Khosrow did not restore power to the feudal nobility or the magi, but centralized his government. Khosrow's reign is considered to be one of the most successful within the Sasanian Empire. The peace agreement between Rome and Iran in 531 gave Khosrow the chance to consolidate power and focus his attention on internal improvement. His reforms and military campaigns marked a renaissance of the Sasanian Empire, which spread philosophic beliefs as well as trade goods from the far east to the far west.

The internal reforms under Khosrow were much more important than those on the exterior frontier. The subsequent reforms resulted in the rise of a bureaucratic state at the expense of the great noble families, strengthening the central government and the power of the Shahanshah. The army too was reorganized and tied to the central government rather than local nobility allowing greater organization, faster mobilization and a far greater cavalry corps. Reforms in taxation provided the empire with stability and a much stronger economy, allowing prolonged military campaigns as well as greater revenues for the bureaucracy.

Tax reforms
Khosrow's tax reforms have been praised by several scholars, the most notable of whom is F. Altheim. The tax reforms, which were started under Kavad I and completely implemented by Khosrow, greatly strengthened the royal court. Prior to Khosrow and Kavad's reigns, a majority of the land was owned by seven Parthian families: Suren, Waraz, Karen, Ispahbudhan, Spandiyadh, Mihran and Zik. These great landowners enjoyed tax exemptions from the Sasanian empire, and were tax collectors within their local provincial areas.

With the outbreak of the Mazdakite revolution, there was a great uprising of peasants and lower-class citizens who grabbed large portions of land under egalitarian values. As a result of this there was great confusion on land possession and ownership. Khosrow surveyed all the land within the empire indiscriminately and began to tax all land under a single program. Tax revenues that previously went to the local noble family now went to the central government treasury. The fixed tax that Khosrow implemented created a more stable form of income for the treasury.

Because the tax did not vary, the treasury could easily estimate the year's revenue. Prior to Khosrow's tax reforms, taxes were collected based on the yield that the land had produced. The new system calculated and averaged taxation based on the water rights for each piece of property. Lands which grew date palms and olive trees used a slightly different method of taxation based on the amount of producing trees that the land contained. These tax reforms of Khosrow were the stepping stone which enabled subsequent reforms in the bureaucracy and the military to take place.

Administrative reforms

The hallmark of Khosrow's bureaucratic reform was the creation of a new social class. Before, the Sasanian Empire consisted of only three social classes, magi, nobles and peasants/commoners. Khosrow added a fourth class to this hierarchy between the nobles and the peasants, called the deghans. The deghans were small land owning citizens of the Sasanian Empire and were considered lower nobility.

Khosrow promoted honest government officials based on trust and honesty, rather than corrupt nobles and magi. The small landowning deghans were favored over the high nobles because they tended to be more trustworthy and owed their loyalty to the Shah for their position in the bureaucracy. The rise of deghans became the backbone of the empire because they now held the majority of land and positions in local and provincial administration.

The reduction of power of the great families improved the empire. This was because previously, each great family ruled a large chunk of land and had their own king. The name Shahanshah, meaning King of Kings, derived from the fact that there were many feudal kings in Sasanian Iran with the Shahanshah as the ruler of them all. Their fall meant their power was redirected to the central government and all taxes now went to the central government rather than to the local nobility.

Military reforms
Major reforms to the military made the Iranian army capable of fighting sustained wars, battling on multiple fronts, and deploy itself faster. Prior to Khosrow's reign, much like other aspects of the empire, the military was dependent on the feudal lords of the great families to provide soldiers and cavalry. Each family would provide their own army and equipment when called by the Shahanshah. This system was replaced with the emergence of the lower deghan nobility class, who was paid and provided by the central government.

The main force of the Sasanian army was the Aswaran cavalry. Previously only nobles could enlist into the Aswaran cavalry which was very limited and created shortages in well trained soldiers. Now that the dehqan class was considered nobility, they were able to join the cavalry force and boosted the number of cavalry force significantly.

The military reform focused more on organization and training of troops. The cavalry was still the most important aspect of the Iranian military, with foot archers being less important, and mass peasant forces being on the bottom of the spectrum.

Khosrow made four military districts with a spahbed, or general, in charge of each district. Before the reforms of Khosrow, the general of the Iranians (Eran-spahbed) controlled the military of the entire empire. The four zones consisted of Mesopotamia in the west, the Caucasus region in the north, the Persian Gulf in the central and southwest region, and Central Asia in the east. This new quadripartition of the Empire not only created a more efficient military system but also "[administration] of a vast, multiregional, multicultural, and multiracial empire".

Equipment
During Khosrow's reign, a "list" for equipment for the cavalry (aswaran) was written. The list comprised a helmet, a gorget, a chain mail shirt, a lamellar coat or cuirass, leg armour, gauntlets, sword, shield, two bows with spare strings, 30 arrows, axe or mace, and horse armour.

Sasanian bullae showing the four spahbeds show that horses were still fully armoured during this period and heavy cavalry tactics were still used by the Sasanian cavalry. It is highly likely that the stirrup had been introduced to the Sasanian cavalry two centuries before Khosrow's reforms (and are mentioned in Bivar (1972)), and a "stirrupped" foot position can be seen on the Sasanian bullae and at Taq-e-Bostan.

Military campaigns

War with the Byzantine Empire, 540–562

Background
In 539 Khosrow had originally attempted to gain a casus belli against the Byzantines by trying to take advantage of a disagreement between his Lakhmid clients and the Byzantine clients Ghassanids, who both claimed ownership of the lands south of Palmyra, near the old Strata Diocletiana. His attempt was, however, thwarted when the Byzantines successfully equivocated the problem. Subsequently, Khosrow accused Justinian of trying to bribe the Lakhmid ruler al-Mundhir III ibn al-Nu'man through his diplomat Summus, and also that he had emboldened some Huns to make incursions into Iran. The Ghassanid ruler al-Harith ibn Jabalah invaded Mundhir's territory and carried off rich booty. Khosrow complained to Justinian about this incident, and requested that the stolen riches be returned to him, including payment for the Arabs that had been killed during the attack. His request was, however, ignored. This incident, along with the support by an emissary from the Ostrogoth king Vitiges, and the Armenians living in Byzantine territory being dissatisfied with their rule, encouraged Khosrow to renew the war against the Byzantines. Justinian's ceaseless wars in North Africa and Italy must have contributed to Khosrow's aspirations as well. Justinian, informed of Khosrow's intention for war, tried to dissuade him, but to no avail.

Sasanian invasion of Syria
In May 540, Khosrow invaded the domains of the Byzantines; he avoided the fortress of Circesium, and instead approached Zenobia, where he made a lukewarm attempt to persuade the fortress to surrender, which proved unsuccessful. He then proceeded to Sura and killed its commander Arsaces in battle. Demoralized by the death of their commander, the residents sent their bishop to parley with Khosrow. Feigning to accept the plea of the bishop, Khosrow took advantage of the occasion and captured the city, which was shortly sacked. Germanus, the cousin of Justinian, sent the bishop of Beroea, Megas, to negotiate with Khosrow. Regardless, Khosrow continued his expedition, threatening the city of Hierapolis, whose custodians swiftly paid him  of silver to leave the city untouched. After receiving additional pleas by Megas, Khosrow agreed to end his expedition in return for ten centenaria. While Megas went back to Antioch to inform Germanus of Khosrow's demands, the latter approached Beroea, which he had sacked. In June, Khosrow reached Antioch, where he offered its citizens to not attack the city in return for ten centenaria. His offer was rejected, and as a result he captured and sacked the city.

Justinian sued for peace, and made a treaty with Khosrow that the Iranians would withdraw back to their domains in return for a payment of 50 centenaria plus 5 centenaria extra each year. Part of treaty also included that the Byzantine envoys were to be hostages of Khosrow as an assurance that the Byzantines would honor the agreement. However, before departing, Khosrow went to the port of Antioch, Seleucia Pieria, where he bathed in the Mediterranean Sea. He then told the envoys that he wished to visit the city of Apamea out of interest, which they reluctantly allowed him, with the condition that he would leave for his domains afterwards. There he held chariot races, where he made the Blue Faction—which was supported by Justinian—lose against the rival Greens. Khosrow extracted tribute from Apamea and other Byzantine towns, at which point Justinian called off his truce and prepared to send his commander Belisarius to move against the Sasanians.

Lazic War

In spring 541, Khosrow brought his army north to Lazica on request of the Lazic king Gubazes II to repel the Byzantines from his territory. The fortress of Petra was afterwards captured by Khosrow's forces, and a protectorate was established over the country. At the same time, Belisarius arrived in Mesopotamia and began besieging the city of Nisibis. Although Belisarius had greatly outnumbered the city garrison, the city was too well fortified and he was forced to ravage the country around the Nisibis, subsequently getting recalled back west. After successful campaigns in Armenia, Khosrow was encouraged once again to attack Syria. Khosrow turned south towards Edessa and besieged the city. Edessa was now a much more important city than Antioch was, and the garrison which occupied the city was able to resist the siege. The Iranians were forced to retreat from Edessa, but were able to forge a five-year truce with the Byzantine Empire in 545. Three years into the five-year truce (548), rebellion against Sasanian control broke out in Lazica. In response, a Byzantine army was sent to support the people of Lazica, effectively ending the established truce and thus continuing the Lazic Wars.

Sometime later, Khosrow, who was keen to wrest Dara from Byzantine control, and would do so even if he risked to break the truce they had made regarding Mesopotamia, tried to capture it by tricking them; he sent one of highest officials, Izadgushasp, as a diplomat to Constantinople, but in reality the latter would stop by Dara, and with the aid of his large crew, he would seize the city. However, this plan was prevented by a former adviser of Belisarius named George, who demanded that if Izadgushasp should enter the city he should have only twenty members of his crew with him. Izadgushasp then left the city and continued his journey to Constantinople, where he was amicably welcomed by Justinian, who gave him some gifts.

In 549 the previous truce between Justinian and Khosrow was disregarded and full war broke out once again between Iranians and Romans. The last major decisive battle of the Lazic wars came in 556 when Byzantine general Martin defeated a massive Sasanian force led by an Iranian nakhvaegan (field marshal). Negotiations between Khosrow and Justinian opened in 556, leading to the Fifty-Year Peace Treaty in 562 in which Iranians would leave Lazica in return for an annual payment of gold.

According to ancient historian Menander Protector, a minor official in Justinian's court, there were 12 points to the treaty, stated in the following passage:

War in the East

With a stable peace agreement with the Byzantines in the west, Khosrow was now able to focus his attention on the eastern Hephthalites and end their domination over Central Asia. Even with the growth of Iranian military power under Khosrow's reforms, the Sasanians were still uneasy at the prospect of attacking the Hephthalite on their own and began to seek allies. Their answer came in the form of Turkic incursions into Central Asia. The movement of Turkic people into Central Asia very quickly made them natural enemies and competitors to the Hephthalites.

The Hephthalites were a strong military power but they lacked the organization to fight on multiple fronts. The Sasanians and the First Turkic Khaganate made an alliance and in 557 launched a two pronged attack on the Hephthalites, taking advantage of their disorganization and disunity. The Hephthalite Empire was destroyed after the battle of Gol-Zarriun, and broke into several minor kingdoms around the Oxus. The Hephthalite king Ghadfar and what was left of his men fled southward to Sasanian territory, where they took refuge. Meanwhile, the Turkic Khagan Sinjibu reached an agreement with the Hephthalite nobility, and appointed Faghanish, the ruler of Chaghaniyan, as the new Hephthalite king.

This was much to the dislike of Khosrow, who considered the Turkic collaboration with the Hephthalites to pose a danger for his rule in the east, and thus marched towards the Sasanian-Turkic border in Gurgan. When he reached the place, he was met by a Turkic delegate of Sinjibu that presented him gifts. There Khosrow asserted his authority and military potency, and persuaded the Turks to make an alliance with him. The alliance contained a treaty that made it obligatory for Faghanish to be sent to the Sasanian court in Ctesiphon and gain the approval of Khosrow for his status as Hephthalite king. Faghanish and his kingdom of Chaghaniyan thus became a vassal of the Sasanian Empire, which set the Oxus as the eastern frontier the Sasanians and Turks. However, friendly relations between Turks and Sasanians quickly deteriorated after that. Both Turks and Iranians wanted to dominate the Silk Road and the trade industry between the west and the far east. In 562 Khosrow II defeated the Hephthalites once again, and then stopped the threat of the Turks.

In 568 a Turkic embassy was sent to Byzantine to propose an alliance and two pronged attack on the Sasanian Empire. Fortunately for the Sasanians, nothing ever came from this proposal. Later in 569/570, Sinjibu attacked and pillaged Sasanian border lands, but a treaty was soon signed. Khosrow then sent a Mihranid named Mihransitad, to estimate the quality of the daughter of the Turkic Khagan. According to Armenian sources her name was Kayen, while Persian sources states that her name was Qaqim-khaqan. After Mihransitad's visit in Central Asia, Khosrow married Qaqim-khaqan. According to some sources, Hormizd IV, the successor of Khosrow, was the son of the Turkic princess. However, Encyclopædia Iranica states that the "marriage with the daughter of the Turkic khaqan is chronologically impossible", and says that Hormizd was born in 540, thirty years before Khosrow's marriage.

Campaign in Yemen against Abyssinia

In 522, before Khosrow's reign, a group of miaphysite Ethiopians led an attack on the dominant Himyarites of southern Arabia. The local Arab leader blunted the attack, and appealed to the Sasanians for aid, while the Ethiopians subsequently turned towards the Byzantines for help. The Ethiopians sent another force across the Red Sea, killed the Arab leader, and crowned an Ethiopian king of the region.

In 531, Justinian suggested that the Ethiopians of Yemen end the Sasanians maritime trade with the Indians. The Ethiopians never met this request because an Ethiopian general named Abraha took control of the Yemenite throne and created an independent nation. After Abraha's death one of his sons, Ma'd-Karib, went into exile while his half-brother took the throne. After being denied by Justinian, Ma'd-Karib sought help from Khosrow, who sent a small fleet and army under commander Vahrez to depose the current king of Yemen. After capturing the capital city San'a'l, Ma'd-Karib's son, Saif enthroned.

Justinian was ultimately responsible for Sasanian maritime presence in Yemen. By not providing the Yemenite Arabs support, Khosrow was able to help Ma'd-Karib and subsequently established Yemen as a principality of the Sasanian Empire.

War with the Byzantine Empire, 572–591

Justinian died in 565 and left Justin II to succeed the throne. In 555, the Sasanian governor of Armenia and a relative of Khosrow, Chihor-Vishnasp (also known as Suren), built a fire temple at the Armenian capital Dvin and put to death a popular and influential member of the Mamikonian family. This execution created tremendous civil unrest and led to a revolt and massacre of the governor including the capture of Dvin in 572. Justin II took advantage of this revolt and used it as an excuse to stop paying annual payments to Khosrow, effectively putting an end to the 51 year peace treaty that was established ten years earlier. Khosrow, who tried to avoid another war, sent a Christian diplomat named Sebokht to Constantinople in order to try to persuade Justin to change his mind. Justin, however, refused to listen to the diplomat, and prepared to help the Armenians, whom he considered his allies, in their war against Khosrow. A Byzantine army was sent into Sasanian territory and besieged Nisibis in the same year.

Meanwhile, Khosrow sent an army under Golon Mihran to Armenia, but the latter was defeated in Taron by the Armenian rebel leader Vardan III Mamikonian, who captured his war elephants as war booty. Sometime later, however, Golon Mihran managed to seize Angl. During the same time, the Siunian prince Vahan asked for Khosrow's permission that he could move his court from Dvin to the capital of Paytakaran, a region in eastern Armenia. Furthermore, Vahan also requested that Paytakaran should be merged with the Adurbadagan province. Khosrow accepted, and did what he asked.

In 573, Khosrow sent an army under Adarmahan to invade Syria, while he himself along with the three Mihranid military officers Izadgushasp, Fariburz and Bahram Chobin led an army towards Dara, where they captured the city after four months, while Adarmahan sacked several cities in Syria, which included Apamea. Justin reportedly lost his mind after these Byzantine disasters, and abdicated.

He was succeeded by Tiberius, a high-ranking military officer in 578. Khosrow invaded Armenia once again feeling that he had the upper hand, and was initially successful. Soon after, the tables turned and the Byzantines gained a lot of local support. This made the Sasanians attempt another truce. However, sometime later, Khosrow, with an army consisting of 12,000 Iranian soldiers including a combined of Sabir-Arab soldiers numbering 8,000 sent by his allies, ravaged the places around Resaina and Constantia in Syria, thus turning the tables once more. During the same time, one of Khosrow's chief generals, Tamkhosrau, managed to trick Maurice by faking an invasion of Theodosiopolis, and then plundered the countryside of Martyropolis and Amida.

However, the tables of the war quickly turned again when the newly appointed Byzantine supreme-commander Maurice entered the field and captured many Sasanian settlements. The revolt came to an end when Khosrow gave amnesty to Armenia and brought them back into the Sasanian empire. Peace negotiations were once again brought back up, but abruptly ended with the death of Khosrow in 579, who was succeeded by his son Hormizd IV.

Religious policy 

Khosrow, like all other Sasanian rulers, was an adherent of Zoroastrianism. Since the 5th century, the Sasanian monarchs had been made aware of the significance of the religious minorities in the realm, and as a result tried to homogenize them into a structure of administration where according to legal principles, all would be treated straightforwardly as mard / zan ī šahr, i.e. "man/woman citizen (of the Empire)." Jews and notably Christians had accepted the concept of Iran and considered themselves part of the nation. By the time of Khosrow, the leader of the Church of the East had the title of "Catholicos of Iran" (Ērān Cathollicos).

Sasanian monarchs only persecuted other religions when it was in their urgent political interests to do. This also applied to Khosrow, who, in the words of Eberhard Sauer, had to "walk a fine line". Khosrow himself used the church considerably, and was fond of its Patriarch, Aba I, whom he wanted to defend against the Zoroastrian priests. Nevertheless, Aba was accused of working with the Byzantines, which was a serious allegation due to the war that had begun in 540. Consequently, in 542, Aba was dismissed from his post, but was only exiled instead of being executed.

Khosrow even enjoyed good relations with Gregory, the Mihranid commander of the Iranian troops in the Caucasus, who had showily disowned Zoroastrianism in front of other troops massed at a feast in 518. This resulted in discontent amongst members of the court, who pressured Khosrow to deal with an apostate from such a powerful and influential family, stating that "It is a great dishonor for the religion of the Magians that such a great man from the lineage of the house of Mihran, who have always been servants of Ohrmazd, now becomes a servant of Christ." Khosrow was thus forced to have Gregory relieved and incarcerated, yet the Mihranids deemed Khosrow's choice insufficient. A son of Gregory's paternal uncle, Mihran, asked Khosrow to execute Gregory for "bringing dishonor to our lineage". The latter was in a good position to make such request, due to recently having defeated the Hephthalites in the east; Gregory was eventually executed.

Khosrow did however deal harshly and swiftly with people with of any belief or practice that ran contrary to Sasanian-mediated Zoroastrian orthodoxy. Aberrance in ceremony and principle exceeded apostasy as "a social and political evil in undermining the foundations of the imperial religion (Payne)." According to Khosrow's supposed autobiographical work of Sirat Anushirwan, he had a party of nobles practicing unorthodoxy executed instantly when he found out about them. According to the book, Khosrow also had another group−supposedly Manichaeans−banished from Iran. This was due to the royal anxieties regarding the chance of religious rogues to upset the political structure, which had recently occurred during Kavad and Khosrow's reigns by the Mazdakites.

Constructions 

Khosrow is known to have ordered many public works projects during his long reign, such  bridges, roads, dams and walls. To protect the frontiers of Iran, Khosrow had a sequence of walls built (and fortified) around his empire, much like the Great Wall of China and Hadrian's Wall in Northern England. Instead of constructing it on one side of the empire, he had it on four. According to Middle Persian sources, Khosrow I ordered the construction of the Great Wall of Gorgan, which extended from the eastern coast of the Caspian Sea to block incursions by nomadic tribes, such as the Hephthalites. In the northwest, he had the Derbent Wall further fortified to protect the area from incursions by Alans, Turks, Sarirs, Khazars, and other northern neighbours.

Another wall was constructed in the southwest, called the war-i tāzigān ("wall of the Arabs"). He may have also built another wall in the northeast−the Wall of Tammisha. Besides defense structures, Khosrow also had a large-scale canal system created in Asoristan, known in Islamic sources as the Nahrawan Canal. Out of all his constructions, his most memorable and noteworthy achievement was the palace he had made at Ctesiphon, known as the Taq-e Kasra. The palace, still standing till this day, albeit heavily ruined, portrays one of the empire's most remarkable architectural accomplishments.

After the sack of Antioch in 540, Khosrow built a new city one parasang south of Ctesiphon for the inhabitants he had captured. It was located on the eastern bank of the Tigris, and was officially named Weh-andīōg-husraw ("City Better than Antioch [has] Khosrow [built this]" or "Khosrow's Better Antioch"). The city reportedly had public baths and a hippodrome, and a street program modelled on Antioch. The Christian population was granted freedom of religion and burial. The city was known informally as Rumagan ("Town of the Greeks"), which later became ar-Rumiyya under the Caliphate. The remains of the city are most likely situated at the unexcavated place that is still till this day known as Bustan Kisra ("Gardens of Khosrow").

Coinage 

The Sassanian revival took place under his rule, so Khosrow minted such inscriptions on his especial issue coinage as "Iranians have become fearless" (ērān abē-bēm kard), and "Iranians became strong" (ērān abzonhēnēd).

Philosopher King

Khosrow I was admired, both in Iran and elsewhere, for his character, virtues, and knowledge of Greek philosophy. He was identified by some Romans as the true philosopher king.

Khosrow I was known to be a great patron of philosophy and knowledge. An entry in the Chronicle of Séert reads:  Khosrow I is known for saying a philosophic quote that follows: 

Khosrow I accepted refugees coming from the Eastern Roman Empire when Justinian closed the neo-Platonist schools in Athens in 529. He was greatly interested in Indian philosophy, science, mathematics, and medicine. He sent multiple embassies and gifts to the Indian court and requested them to send back philosophers to teach in his court in return. Khosrow made many translations of texts from Greek, Sanskrit, and Syriac into Middle Persian. He received the title of "Plato's Philosopher King" by the Greek refugees that he allowed into his empire because of his great interest in Platonic philosophy. Nöldeke states that Khosrow I was "certainly one of the most efficient and best kings that the Iranians have ever had".

A synthesis of Greek, Iranian, Indian, and Armenian learning traditions took place within the Sasanian Empire. One outcome of this synthesis created what is known as bimaristan, the first hospital that introduced a concept of segregating wards according to pathology. Greek pharmacology fused with Iranian and Indian traditions resulted in significant advances in medicine. According to historian Richard Frye, this great influx of knowledge created a renaissance during, and proceeding Khosrow's reign.

Intellectual games such as chess and backgammon demonstrated and celebrated the diplomatic relationship between Khosrow and a "great king of India." The vizier of the Indian king invented chess as a cheerful, playful challenge to King Khosrow. It seems that the Indian ruler who sent the game of chess to Khosrow was the Maukhari King Śarvavarman of Kannauj, between the
beginning of Śarvavarman's reign in 560/565 and the end of Khosrow's reign in 579. When the game was sent to Iran it came with a letter which read: "As your name is the King of Kings, all your emperorship over us connotes that your wise men should be wiser than ours. Either you send us an explanation of this game of chess or send revenue and tribute us." Khosrow's grand vizier successfully solved the riddle and figured out how to play chess. In response the wise vizier created the game backgammon and sent it to the Indian court with the same message. The Indian king was not able to solve the riddle and was forced to pay tribute.

Academy of Gondishapur

Khosrow I is known to have greatly expanded the Academy of Gondishapur, located in the city of Gundeshapur. As to the development of non-religious knowledge and research in Iran and apart from historical evidence given on such traditions in the preceding Iranian Empires, there are reports on systematic activities initiated by the Sasanian court as early as in the first decades of Sasanian rule. The Middle Persian encyclopaedia Denkard states that during the reign of Shapur I writings of this kind were collected and added to the Avesta. And an atmosphere of vivid reflection and discussion at the early Sasanian court in the third century AD is reflected in such accounts.
The foundation of the Academy of Gondishapur introduced the studies of philosophy, medicine, physics, poetry, rhetoric, and astronomy into the Sasanian court. According to some historical accounts, this famous learning center was built in order to provide a place for incoming Greek refugees to study and share their knowledge. Gundeshapur became the focal point of the combination of Greek and Indian sciences along with Iranian and Syriac traditions. The cosmopolitan which was introduced by the institution of Gondishapur became a catalyst for modern studies.

Legacy

Although Khosrow's achievements were highly successful and helped centralize the empire, they did not last long after his death. The local officials and great noble families resented the fact that their power had been stripped away from them and began to quickly regain power after his death. Khosrow's reign had a major impact on Islamic culture and political life. Many of his policies and reforms were brought into the Islamic nation in their transformation from a decentralized confederation into a centralized empire.

There are a considerable number of Islamic works that were inspired by the reign of Khosrow I, for example the Kitab al-Taj of Jahiz. The high number of Islamic texts referring to Khosrow's reign can make it hard to distinguish fact from fallacy.

During his reign the Silk Road between ancient China, India and the western world was promoted and possibly even created. Richard Frye argues that Khosrow's rationale behind his numerous wars with the Byzantine empire as well as the eastern Hephthalites was to establish the Sasanian dominance on this trade route.

Family tree

Notes

References

Bibliography

Ancient works 
Procopius, History of the Wars.

Modern works 
 
 
 

 
 
 
 
  
 
 
 
 
 
 
 

 
 
 
 

 
 
 
 
 

 
 
 
 
 
 
 
 

 
 

 
 
 
 

 
 
 
 

 
 
 
 
 
 

 
501 births
579 deaths
6th-century Sasanian monarchs
People of the Roman–Sasanian Wars
People from Ardestan
Shahnameh characters
Abyssinian–Persian wars
Lazic War
Tax reform
Law reform
Military reforms
Reformers
Social reformers
City founders